Priscila Guadalupe Padilla Rentería (born 12 December 1999), known as Priscila Padilla, is a Mexican professional football defender who currently plays for Guadalajara (Chivas) of the Liga MX Femenil, the first professional women's football league in Mexico. In 2017, she helped Chivas win the first professional women's football championship in the country in front of 32,466 spectators.

Early life
Padilla began playing football as a child with her brother. While her mother did not want her to play, her father encouraged her passion for the game.

Playing career

Guadalajara, 2017– 
Padilla began playing for Guadalajara during the inaugural season of Liga MX Femenil. After helping lead the team to the final, she noted that at the beginning of the season, few believed in them and now they were the main team of the tournament. The team went on to win the championship final which set a new record for attendance at a women's professional soccer game. In February 2018, she scored a goal during the team's 4–1 win over Santos Laguna.

Honours

Club
Guadalajara
Liga MX Femenil: Apertura 2017

References

External links
 
 Priscila Padilla at C.D. Guadalajara Femenil 

1999 births
Living people
Mexican women's footballers
People from Tlaquepaque
Liga MX Femenil players
C.D. Guadalajara (women) footballers
Women's association football defenders